Whom the Gods Love may refer to:

 Whom the Gods Love (1936 film), a British biographical film
 Whom the Gods Love (1942 film), an Austrian historical musical film